Zachery Michael Pop (born September 20, 1996) is a Canadian professional baseball pitcher for the Toronto Blue Jays of Major League Baseball (MLB). He made his MLB debut in 2021 with the Miami Marlins.

Career

Amateur
Pop attended Notre Dame Catholic Secondary School in Brampton, Ontario. He was drafted by the Toronto Blue Jays in the 23rd round of the 2014 Major League Baseball Draft, but did not sign and played college baseball at the University of Kentucky. In 2016, he played collegiate summer baseball for the Wareham Gatemen of the Cape Cod Baseball League.

Los Angeles Dodgers
Pop was drafted by the Los Angeles Dodgers in the seventh round of the 2017 MLB Draft. He signed and made his professional debut with the AZL Dodgers, pitching five scoreless innings. In 2018, he began the year with the Great Lakes Loons before being promoted to the Rancho Cucamonga Quakes.

Baltimore Orioles
On July 18, 2018, Pop was traded to the Baltimore Orioles along with Breyvic Valera, Dean Kremer, Yusniel Diaz, and Rylan Bannon in exchange for Manny Machado. He was assigned to the Bowie Baysox and finished the season there. In 44 relief appearances between Great Lakes, Rancho Cucamonga, and Bowie, he compiled a 2–3 record with a 1.53 ERA. He returned to Bowie to begin 2019, and went 1–0 with a 0.84 ERA in 10.2 innings. On May 14, he underwent Tommy John surgery, and missed the rest of the 2019 season. Pop did not play in a game in 2020 due to the cancellation of the minor league season because of the COVID-19 pandemic.

Miami Marlins
Pop was selected by the Arizona Diamondbacks in the 2020 Rule 5 Draft. Shortly after, Pop was traded to the Miami Marlins in exchange for Tyler Jones. Pop made the Marlins' Opening Day roster. On April 3, 2021, Pop made his MLB debut, pitching a scoreless inning of relief against the Tampa Bay Rays.

Toronto Blue Jays
Pop, a Brampton native, was traded to the Toronto Blue Jays with Anthony Bass and a player to be named later for prospect Jordan Groshans on August 2, 2022.

See also
Rule 5 draft results

References

External links

Living people
1996 births
Sportspeople from Brampton
Major League Baseball players from Canada
Major League Baseball pitchers
Miami Marlins players
Toronto Blue Jays players
Kentucky Wildcats baseball players
St. Cloud Rox players
Wareham Gatemen players
Arizona League Dodgers players
Great Lakes Loons players
Rancho Cucamonga Quakes players
Bowie Baysox players
Buffalo Bisons (minor league) players